The 2019 Emir of Qatar Cup is the 47th edition of the Qatari cup tournament in men's football. It will be played by the first and second level divisions of the Qatari football league structure. The cup winner is guaranteed a place in the 2020 AFC Champions League.

The draw of the tournament was held on 15 April 2019.

Note: all matches in Qatar time (GMT+3).

Preliminary round

First round

Second round

Quarter-finals

Semi-finals

Final

References

External links
Amir Cup, Qatar Football Association
Emir Cup 2019, Soccerway

Football cup competitions in Qatar
Qatar
2018–19 in Qatari football